The Age-Herald Building, at 2107 5th Ave. N in Birmingham, Alabama, was built in 1910.  It was listed on the National Register of Historic Places in 1984.

It was designed by Birmingham architect William C. Weston and is "one of the best examples of the Beaux Arts style in Birmingham".  Also the "building is strongly associated with a major early newspaper in Birmingham—The Age-Herald. It was constructed to house the paper shortly after its creation in 1909 from a merger of The Iron Age and The Elyton Herald, and served as the headquarters of that paper until 1920."

References

External links

National Register of Historic Places in Jefferson County, Alabama
Beaux-Arts architecture in Alabama
Commercial buildings completed in 1910